1996 Uganda Cup was the 22nd season of the main Ugandan football Cup.

Overview
The competition was known as the Kakungulu Cup and concluded on 2 November 1996 at Jinja where Uganda Electricity Board FC beat Nile Breweries FC 1-0 in the final.

Quarter-finals
The 4 matches in this round were played between 7 October and 21 October 1996.

Semi-finals
The semi-finals were played on 23 and 24 October 19961.

Final
The final was played on 2 November 1996 at Jinja.

Footnotes

External links
 Uganda - List of Cup Finals - RSSSF (Mikael Jönsson, Ian King and Hans Schöggl)

Ugandan Cup
Uganda Cup
Cup